Volodymyr Volodymyrovych Lukashenko (often Vladimir as in Russian, born 14 February 1980) is a Ukrainian sabre fencer.

He competed at the 2000 and 2004 Summer Olympics.

Lukashenko won the silver medal in the sabre team event at the 2006 World Fencing Championships after losing to France in the final. He accomplished this with his teammates Dmytro Boiko, Oleh Shturbabin and Vladyslav Tretiak.

He was the 2003 World Champion for Men's Sabre.

References

External links
 
 
 
  (archive)
 Володимир Лукашенко entry in the Encyclopedia of Contemporary Ukraine

1980 births
Living people
Ukrainian male sabre fencers
Olympic fencers of Ukraine
Fencers at the 2000 Summer Olympics
Fencers at the 2004 Summer Olympics
Universiade medalists in fencing
Universiade gold medalists for Ukraine
Sportspeople from Kyiv
National University of Ukraine on Physical Education and Sport alumni